Aliabad (also Romanized as ‘Alīābād; also known as Ali Abad Japlogh) is a village in Khorram Dasht Rural District, Kamareh District, Khomeyn County, Markazi Province, Iran. At the 2006 census, its population was 234, in 56 families.

References 

Populated places in Khomeyn County